Cai Dafeng (born 1960) is a Chinese politician and architect currently serving as chairperson of the Central Committee of the China Association for Promoting Democracy (2017–present) and Vice Chairperson of the 13th National People's Congress Standing Committee (2018–present).

Cai was born in Shanghai in 1960. From 1978 to 1985 he was educated at Tongji University, majoring in architecture, where he graduated in 1985 and obtained a master's degree. In the same year he became a cadre in Shanghai Museum. In February 1987, he studied for a doctorate degree in architecture at Tongji University. In October 1990, he served as a lecturer in the Department of Architecture of Tongji University. In September 1993, he served successively as associate professor, professor, associate dean and dean of the Department of Culture and Museology of Fudan University. He joined the China Association for Promoting Democracy in February 1995. In July 1999, he served as Director of the Academic Affairs Office of Fudan University. Since March 2003, he has served as Vice President of Fudan University. In January 2008, he served as deputy director of the Standing Committee of the Shanghai Municipal People's Congress. In April 2016, he served as the Vice President of Tongji University. In December 2016, he served as executive vice chairman of the Central Committee of China Association for Promoting Democracy.

On December 6, 2017, Cai was elected as the chairman of the Central Committee of the China Association for Promoting Democracy. On March 17, 2018, he was elected as a Vice Chairman of the 13th National People's Congress.

On 7 December 2020, pursuant to Executive Order 13936, the US Department of the Treasury imposed sanctions on all 14 Vice Chairperson of the National People's Congress, including Cai, for "undermining Hong Kong's autonomy and restricting the freedom of expression or assembly."

References 

1960 births
Living people
Chairperson and vice chairpersons of the Standing Committee of the 13th National People's Congress
Chinese architects
Delegates to the 10th National People's Congress
Academic staff of Fudan University
Individuals sanctioned by the United States under the Hong Kong Autonomy Act
Members of the Standing Committee of the 11th Chinese People's Political Consultative Conference
Members of the Standing Committee of the 12th Chinese People's Political Consultative Conference
Members of the China Association for Promoting Democracy
Politicians from Shanghai
Tongji University alumni
Academic staff of Tongji University